.af is the Internet country code top-level domain (ccTLD) for Afghanistan. It is administered by AFGNIC, a service of the UNDP. As of 26 August 2020, .af was used by 5960 domains.

Registration is made directly at the second level, or on the third level beneath various categorized subdomains at the second level. Third-level domains have restrictions based on which second-level domain they are registered under. Registration on the second level is unrestricted, but more expensive. All fees are higher for international registrants.

The .af domain was delegated to Abdul Razeeq in 1997, a year after Taliban fighters had captured Kabul and founded the Islamic Emirate of Afghanistan. NetNames of London initially maintained the domain following an agreement with the IANA. Razeeq later disappeared, halting some services. The domain was reopened on March 10, 2003, as a joint program between UNDP and the Afghan Ministry of Communications.

With the fall of Kabul the .af domain again came under the control of the Taliban. ICANN said it "defers decision making to within the country".

Second-level domains
.gov.af
.com.af
.org.af
.net.af
.edu.af
.tv.af
.media.af

References

External links
 IANA .af whois information
 AFGNIC official site
 AfghanServer, .af registrant

Internet in Afghanistan
Country code top-level domains
Council of European National Top Level Domain Registries members
Computer-related introductions in 1997

sv:Toppdomän#A